Platåberget is a mountain in Nordenskiöld Land on the island of Spitsbergen in Svalbard, Norway. It is bordered to the west by Bjørndalen, to the east by Blomsterdalen and to the north by Hotellneset and Adventfjorden.
The mountain is a few kilometers from Longyearbyen and is next to Svalbard Airport, Longyear. It is the site of Svalbard Satellite Station and Svalbard Global Seed Vault.

On 30 April 1995, a 22-year-old Norwegian college student Nina Olaussen was killed by a polar bear on Platåberget, only a few kilometers from Longyearbyen.

References

Longyearbyen
Mountains of Spitsbergen